Thamizhan is a 2002 Indian Tamil-language courtroom drama film directed by debutant Majith and produced by G. Venkateswaran. The film stars Vijay and Priyanka Chopra. Chopra made her debut in cinema through this film. Revathi, Nassar, Ashish Vidyarthi and Vivek also play pivotal roles in the film, while the film's score and soundtrack were composed by D. Imman. The story involves solving several corruption cases by a lawyer named Surya in the process fighting against a criminal boss and finally making Indian law basics available as a free book to common people. The film released on 12 April 2002. It received mixed reviews but was a commercial success at the box office and its satellite rights were bought by Sun TV for a good price.

Plot
Surya is a happy-go-lucky guy and often gets involved in petty fights. He falls in love with Priya. His sister's lawyer husband Sakthivel advises him to work under senior lawyer Lakshminarayanan. He becomes an upright lawyer who values and tries to redress things the legally. Sakthivel is killed in the process of upholding justice by a corrupt bigwig GK.

He takes up a mission to make the layman understand his legal rights and learn the Indian law basics. So, Surya is seen as a hero by the Indian people. GK's dairy factory gets sealed by Surya for violating food safety norms. Surya's sister Jaya also meets a pitiful end at the hands of GK's goons, but Surya refuses to give up. GK's goons start a riot in a village and put the blame on Surya. Surya is arrested and beaten up by the corrupt cops, and retaliates in return. Surya is summoned at the court and fights up legally, suggesting several reforms in the judicial system of India. After Surya gets released, GK attempts to shoot him but gets thrashed by the people. Surya tells GK to reform before he gets punished. For his service, Surya is honoured by the President of India. Finally, it is shown that Surya's dream had come true.

Cast

Production
In 2001, producer G. Venkateswaran signed on Thirupathisamy to direct Vijay in an action film titled Velan. The film, a remake of the director's Telugu film Azad, saw Priyanka Chopra, winner of the beauty pageant Miss World 2000, being brought in by Venkateswaren to make her debut and play the lead female role. However, before production began, Thirupathisamy died in an accident and Venkateswaren duly decided to give debutant Majith a chance to direct a film with the same cast. To prepare for her role in the film, Priyanka watched Tamil films and tried to pick up a Tamil accent.

Gautami was initially selected to play Vijay's sister in the film, but was later replaced by Revathi. Vivek was signed on to film comedy scenes for a sum of 15 lakh. A new technical team of music director 18-year-old Imman, who had scored for serials earlier, and cinematographer Ekambaram, who had apprenticed with Jeeva, were also selected. Furthermore, the sets were designed by Sabu Cyril, dance choreography was by Raju Sundaram, and stunts were arranged by Super Subbarayan.

A scene for the film featured the producer and lyricist Vairamuthu making guest appearances as themselves during a book launch event. The patriotic nature of the film led to a postal stamp being released with Vijay's face on it. The similarities of title and release date between Thamizhan and the Prashanth-starrer Thamizh created confusion, with the producers of both films unable to accommodate any changes.

Release and reception
The film was released on 12 April 2002. Made on a high budget of 5 crore, Thamizhan was sold for 11.5 crore to distributors.

The film was later dubbed in Hindi as Jeet - Born To Win (2009).

Malathi Rangarajan of The Hindu praised Vijay's image change and claimed he acts out a "creditable portrayal", while adding that "dialogue is a strong point of the film". She further added "debutante Priyanka Chopra has precious little to do" and that Revathi's role was of a clichéd elder sister. In comparison, a reviewer from Bizhat.com stated that "the message conveyed leaves you exhausted and stressed", giving the film an average review. Ananda Vikatan rated the film 40 out of 100.

Soundtrack

The soundtrack of the film was composed by D. Imman, who made his debut at 19 years old.  Priyanka Chopra sang a song in the film, with Vijay recommending her after he had heard her humming to a tune.

References

External links
 

Indian courtroom films
2002 films
Indian legal films
2000s Tamil-language films
Films scored by D. Imman
2002 action drama films
Indian action drama films
2002 directorial debut films